The Ministry of Mines and Minerals Development is a ministry in Zambia. It is headed by the Minister of Mines and Minerals Development.

List of ministers

Deputy ministers

References

External links
Official website

Mines
 
Mining in Zambia